Iván Vázquez may refer to:

 Iván Vázquez Mellado (born 1982), Mexican football goalkeeper
 Iván Vázquez Rodríguez (born 1988), Spanish football manager

See also
 Iván Vásquez, Chilean football midfielder